Alberto da Giussano (in Lombard Albert de Giussan, in Latin Albertus de Gluxano) is a legendary character of the 12th century who would have participated, as a protagonist, in the battle of Legnano on 29 May 1176. In reality, according to historians, the actual military leader of the Lombard League in the famous military battle with Frederick Barbarossa was Guido da Landriano. Historical analyses made over time have indeed shown that the figure of Alberto da Giussano never existed.

In the past, historians, attempting to find a real confirmation, hypothesized the identification of his figure with Albertus de Carathe (Alberto da Carate) and Albertus Longus (Alberto Longo), both among the Milanese who signed the pact in Cremona in March 1167 which established the Lombard League, or in an Alberto da Giussano mentioned in an appeal of 1196 presented to Pope Celestine III on the administration of the church-hospital of San Sempliciano. These, however, are all weak identifications, given that they lack clear and convincing historical confirmation.

History

The legend 

The name of Alberto da Giussano appeared for the first time in the historical chronicle of the city of Milan written by the Dominican friar Galvano Fiamma in the first half of the 14th century, that is 150 years after the battle of Legnano. Alberto da Giussano was described as a knight who distinguished himself, together with his brothers Ottone and Raniero, in the battle of 29 May 1176. According to Galvano Fiamma, he headed the Company of Death, a military association of 900 young knights.

The Company of Death owed its name to the oath that made its members, which foresaw the struggle until the last breath without ever lowering its arms. According to Galvano Fiamma, the Company of Death defended the Carroccio to the extreme and then carried out, in the final stages of the battle of Legnano, a charge against the imperial army of Frederick Barbarossa.

However, contemporary sources at the battle of Legnano do not mention either the existence of Alberto da Giussano or that of the Company of Death.

From an excerpt from the Chronica Galvanica by Galvano Fiamma we can read:

While, on another excerpt of the same work, this time on the battle of Legnano, we can read that:

The stories of Fiamma should be taken with the benefit of the doubt since in his chronicles there are inaccuracies, inaccuracies and legendary facts. As regards this last aspect, Fiamma declares that a certain "Leone priest" has seen, during the battle of Legnano, three doves coming out of the burials of the saints Sisinnio, Martirio and Alessandro at the basilica of San Simpliciano in Milan. The three birds then leaned on the Carroccio during the battle causing the escape of Barbarossa. In these chronicles it is also mentioned that the military structures that defended the Carroccio were three. The first was the aforementioned Company of Death, which included 900 knights, each of whom would have been provided with a gold ring. The second company was instead made up of 300 commoners guarding the Carroccio, while the third was made up of 300 scythed carts, each of which was led by ten soldiers.

From these assertions we can certainly deduce the unreliability of the tales of Galvano. It is indeed unlikely that the battle was won by the Lombard League thanks to three doves that put Barbarossa in flight. Moreover, it seems equally doubtful that Milan, during the situation of economic hardship caused by the war, had supplied as many as 900 gold rings to the knights of the Company of Death. In addition it seems strange that the other chronicles of the time do not mention nor the presence of 300 scythed carts, which would have been a very special event certainly noteworthy, neither Alberto da Giussano, nor the three military companies.

Galvano Fiamma, finally, in his writings, as regards the chronicles of the battle, reports the crippled toponym of "Carate" instead of Cairate (where Barbarossa, actually, stayed the night before the battle of Legnano), and asserts that there were two clashes between Barbarossa and the Lombard League: one at "Carate" (1176) and the second between Legnano and Dairago (29 May 1177), thus inventing an elusive battle of "Carate" and moving the battle of Legnano to following year. This supports the thesis that these facts told in reality are nothing other than the fantasies of Galvano. The fact that Alberto da Giussano and the Company of Death never existed was then confirmed by many historical analyzes that took place over time.

The reason for the invention of the figure of Alberto da Giussano by Galvano Fiamma probably lies in the attempt to provide the Lombard League with a heroic and prominent figure that would be in contrast to that of Barbarossa.

The historical facts 

On the other hand, based on historical sources, the heroic and decisive resistance around the Carroccio was carried out by the municipal infantry, which allowed the remaining part of the army of the Lombard League, actually led by Guido da Landriano, to arrive from Milan and defeat Frederick Barbarossa in the famous battle of Legnano. The Carroccio, in particular, was positioned on the edge of a steep slope flanking the Olona river, so that the imperial cavalry, whose arrival was expected along the river, would have been forced to attack the center of the Lombard League's army going up the escarpment. Barbarossa was therefore forced to attack the municipal army in a situation of disadvantage, given that it would have had to attack from below going up this valley.

Considering the phases of the battle, this could mean that the famous battle could have been fought also on part of the territory now belonging to the municipality of San Giorgio su Legnano near the Legnano district "Costa of San Giorgio", or on the territory of today San Martino district in Legnano, since it is not possible to identify, in other parts of the area, a depression with these characteristics. The army of Barbarossa then arrived on the opposite side, from Borsano: this forced the municipal infantrymen to resist around the Carroccio, given that they had the escape road blocked by the Olona river, which they had behind.

Historical research

Alberto da Giussano was a name quite in vogue at the time. Historical researches carried out for other purposes by Pio Pecchiai have traced this Alberto da Giussano, Milanese, contemporary to the events mentioned, which is mentioned, in 1196, in an appeal presented to Pope Celestine III by fifty neighbors of the Porta Comasina in Milan for a dispute over the administration of the church-hospital of San Sempliciano (at the time the hospitals were often linked to religious structures).

The fact that the name of an Alberto da Giussano appears can give us at least some certainty of existence, precisely in years close to the time of the struggle of the  Lombard League against Frederick Barbarossa, of a person of that name, although there is no certainty that it was a leader, much less that he was referring to the captain who took part in the battle at the head of the Company of Death. It was then attempted to identify Alberto da Giussano with two historical figures, Albertus de Carathe (Alberto da Carate) and Albertus Longus (Alberto Longo), who are among the signatories, for the municipality of Milan, of the founding pact of the Lombard League (Cremona, March 1167).

The most surprising fact, however, remains that the Alberto da Giussano mentioned in the notarial document of the time would have lived near the church-church of San Simpliciano where the legend tells that the three white doves that the fighters would have seen during the battle of Legnano perched on the mast of the Carroccio. The notarial document which contains the undated list is in any case attributable to the years 1195–1196, which shows that the "Da Giussano" family is from Milan and also presents its exponents at the top of the municipal institutions of the city.

Contemporary to the battle of Legnano is also a certain Ottone da Giussano, who owned property in Arosio (very close to Giussano) and surroundings. He must have been a rich and remarkable person: his name appears in records of 1183, that is the same year of the signing of the Peace of Constance (which was signed on 25 June 1183 between Federico Barbarossa and representatives of the Lombard League following the events connected at the Battle of Legnano), as well as documents from 1190, 1199 and 1202. In these documents, however, it is not specified whether he was the brother of Alberto and Rainerio, or of the two brothers who, according to legend, participated in the battle of Legnano. The only certain fact is that it was a really wealthy person and that he would certainly have everything to lose with Barbarossa's policy.

However, all these identifications in people who actually existed in the Alberto da Giussano captain of the Lombard League are weak, given that they lack clear and convincing historical confirmation.

Legacy
Italian political party Lega Nord makes use of his myth. The electoral emblem of the party features Alberto with an image inspired by the statue of him erected at Legnano in 1900. Also the infantry brigade Legnano  of the Italian Army used  the image of this statue as symbol. Also the Giussano-class cruiser.

In popular culture
In the 2009 film Barbarossa, Alberto played by Raz Degan is featured as the protagonist.

See also
Battle of Legnano
Company of Death
Lombard League

Citations

References

 
 
 
 
 
 
 

12th-century deaths
Heroes in mythology and legend
Year of birth unknown
Padanian nationalism
History of Lombardy